The 2016 season is the Houston Dash's third season as an American professional women's soccer team in the NWSL.

Club

Coaching staff

First-team squad

Standings and Match Results

Preseason

Friendlies

National Women's Soccer League

League standings

Results summary

Results by matchday

Matches

Awards

NWSL Yearly Awards

NWSL Team of the Year

NWSL Weekly Awards

NWSL Player of the Week

NWSL Goal of the Week

NWSL Save of the Week

Squad statistics
Source: NWSL

Notes

References

See also

Houston Dash seasons
Houston Dash
Houston Dash
Houston Dash